Grégory Le Corvec (born 4 March 1977) is a French rugby union footballer. He currently plays for USA Perpignan in the Top 14. His usual position is at flanker.

Prior to playing for USAP, he played with RC Toulon and Stade Montois. He joined USAP in 2000. He has also played for France 'A' and was included in France's mid-year Test squad for 2007. He made his debut against New Zealand on 2 June 2007, this is his only cap for the national side.

External links
 2Rugby profile

1977 births
Living people
French rugby union players
Rugby union flankers
USA Perpignan players
France international rugby union players